St Stanislas College is a conglomerate of private Catholic secondary schools located in Delft, Pijnacker, and Rijswijk, in the province of South Holland, in the Netherlands. 

Saint Stanislas College itself was founded in Delft as a Gymnasium in 1948 by the Society of Jesus. When other surrounding schools needed to work together to secure funding they joined to form a conglomerate. In 2007, there were 4,253 students. It is the third largest school in Delft, after the Christian Lyceum Delft and Grotius College. The College is part of the international network of Jesuit schools.

History
When the college was founded,  it was one of seven Jesuit schools in the Netherlands. The others were: St Willibrord College in Katwijk, which became Catholic Comprehensive School, Breul; Ignatius Gymnasium in Amsterdam; Maartenscollege, Groningen; Aloysius College, The Hague; and Canisius College, Nijmegen. The group had the acronym 'WIMACS'. In the 1980s and 1990s, with the exception of St Stanislas College, control of the schools was transferred to the local government, and because of mergers with other conglomerates, eventually those other schools lost their affiliation with the Jesuits.

Locations
The conglomerate has seven schools:
 Westplantsoen in Delft is the main location where Saint Stanislas College was founded by the Jesuits. Lessons there are taught at the Hoger algemeen voortgezet onderwijs (HAVO) and Voorbereidend wetenschappelijk onderwijs (VWO) levels. It has about 1800 students.
 Reinier de Graafpad teaches the Voorbereidend middelbaar beroepsonderwijs (VMBO) and the HAVO for the first three years. After taking the HAVO, students can transfer to another secondary school. It has approximately 750 students.
 Krakeelpolderweg teaches the VMBO and has about 440 students.
 Pijnacker teaches the VMBO, HAVO, and VWO and has about 1250 students.
 Lodewijk Makeblijde College in Rijswijk has been part of the organization since 2008.

Chapel
St Stanislas Chapel is outside the front entrance to the  college. The foundation stone was laid on 21 June 1955. It was consecrated on 13 November 1956, the anniversary of St Stanislas, by the Bishop of Rotterdam, Martinus Jansen. The architect of the chapel, which was designed in the style of the Bossche School, was Jan van der Laan.

Notable alumni

 Hans van Heijningen (graduated 1972), Socialist Party politician
 Peter Tetteroo (graduated 1981), journalist
 Theo Verbey (graduated 1977), composer
 Jessie Jazz Vuijk (graduated 2011), model

Gallery

See also

 Education in the Netherlands
 List of Jesuit schools
 List of Jesuit sites in the Netherlands

References

External links
 St Stanislas College site

Delft, Stanislas
Buildings and structures in Delft
Schools in South Holland
1948 establishments in the Netherlands
Educational institutions established in 1948